Ranga Rao or Rangarao is an Indian name.

It may also refer to:
 M. Ranga Rao, Indian musician and composer
 Goddanti Ranga Rao
 Ramakrishna Ranga Rao of Bobbili, Indian politician and zamindar who served as the Chief Minister of Madras Presidency
 Ravichettu Ranga Rao, Telugu writer of Andhra Pradesh
 Sakshi Ranga Rao, Telugu film actor and writer
 S. V. Ranga Rao or Samarla Venkata Ranga Rao, South Indian actor, director and producer
 Venkata Ranga Rao, Indian landlord and zamindar of Bobbili 
 V. K. R. V. Rao or Vijendra Kasturi Ranga Varadaraja Rao, Indian economist, politician and educator